Mohammad or Muhammad Ramzan may refer to:

 Mohammad Ramzan (cricketer), former Pakistani Test cricketer
 Muhammad Ramzan (preacher), founder of Dawat-e-Islami
 Muhammad Ramzan (swimmer), Pakistani Olympic swimmer